Nicole Ménard (born December 27, 1948 in Saint-Constant, Quebec) is a Quebec politician. She was the Quebec Liberal Party member of the National Assembly of Quebec for the riding of Laporte in the Montérégie region from 2007 to 2022, serving as Minister of Tourism when her party was in power.

She studied at the École des hautes études commerciales de Montréal and the Centre international de recherches et d'études en management in business administration and strategic management before taking an Advanced Executive Program at Northwestern University in Chicago.

Menard has worked at the Bank of Montreal since 1967 and was the director of the bank's regional division in Montreal North. She has been the vice-president of the bank since 1995. She has headed several foundations and received several awards for her work.

Menard was elected as MNA member for Laporte replacing former Finance Minister Michel Audet, who did not seek a re-election in the 2007. She was named parliamentary secretary to the Minister of Economic Development, Innovation and  Export Trade, portfolios currently held by Raymond Bachand. She was also parliamentary secretary to the Minister of Tourism and, following the 2008 election, she was promoted to Bachand's position in the Cabinet.

External links
 
 Quebec Liberal Party page

Living people
Women government ministers of Canada
Members of the Executive Council of Quebec
1948 births
Quebec Liberal Party MNAs
Women MNAs in Quebec
Université de Montréal alumni
People from Saint-Constant, Quebec
21st-century Canadian politicians
21st-century Canadian women politicians
Canadian bankers